The Dublin Rams are an ice hockey that used to play in the now defunct Irish Ice hockey league Irish Ice Hockey League. One of five teams in the newly formed league, they are coached by Zachary Baylis.

History
The Rams were created in February 2007 to add depth to the newly created Irish League. Their home rink is the Dundalk Ice Dome and they are one of three teams that play out of Dublin. The Flyers IHC and Latvian Hawks are also based in Dublin. Their Club President, John Podedworny, is also the President of Dunkin' Donuts. In addition, the Rams have an A team in the NHL Development Division.

In the inaugural 2007–08 season, the Rams finished with 11 wins, 1 overtime loss, and 4 losses, and were positioned in 2nd place in the IIHL with 34 points. The Rams were the only team during the regular season to defeat the Dundalk Bulls when they did so on February 16, 2008. The Dublin Rams went on to defeat the Flyers IHC in the IIHL semi finals by a score of 4–1. In the first ever all Ireland final, the Rams lost to the Dundalk Bulls by a score of 6–3 in a well-fought game.

2009 roster
As of January 29, 2013:

References

External links
Official website
Irish Ice Hockey Association

2007 establishments in Ireland
Ice hockey clubs established in 2007
Ice hockey teams in County Dublin
Ice hockey teams in Ireland